Stigmella benanderella is a moth of the family Nepticulidae. It has a scattered distribution in Europe. It has been recorded from Fennoscandia, Denmark, the Baltic region, Hungary and Slovakia.

The larvae feed on Salix phylicifolia, Salix repens and Salix rosmarinifolia. They mine the leaves of their host plant. The mine consists of a short corridor, almost completely filled with frass, widening into, and often overrun by, a short blotch. Pupation takes place outside of the mine.

External links
Fauna Europaea
bladmineerders.nl

Nepticulidae
Moths of Europe
Moths described in 1955